Windermere Park is a suburb of the City of Lake Macquarie in New South Wales, Australia, and is located on a peninsula east of the town of Morisset on the western side of Lake Macquarie.

History 
The Awabakal are the traditional people of this area.

References

External links
History of Windermere Park (Lake Macquarie City Library)

Suburbs of Lake Macquarie